Brandywine Creek in Crawford County, Ohio is a  tributary of Broken Sword Creek.

See also
List of rivers of Ohio

References

Rivers of Ohio
Rivers of Crawford County, Ohio
Sandusky River